Barry 'Hooker' Harrison (21 December 1935 – 20 September 2004) was an Australian rules footballer who played for Collingwood and North Melbourne in the Victorian Football League (VFL).

Harrison, a ruckman, was known for his aggressive style of play. He spent the 1954 and 1955 seasons with the reserves and then joined the Navy as part of his National service which delayed his senior debut until 1958. His tagging job on Ron Barassi helped Collingwood win the 1958 Grand Final, as he not only kept the ball away from the Melbourne midfielder but also roughed him up, as demonstrated by his report for charging.

He was delisted at the end of the 1961 season and after an unsuccessful return to the league with North Melbourne, Harrison became captain-coach of Sandringham. From 1965 to 1969 he was coach of the VFA club, the final three years in a non playing capacity.

References

Holmesby, Russell and Main, Jim (2007). The Encyclopedia of AFL Footballers. 7th ed. Melbourne: Bas Publishing.

1935 births
Australian rules footballers from Victoria (Australia)
Collingwood Football Club players
Collingwood Football Club Premiership players
North Melbourne Football Club players
Sandringham Football Club players
Sandringham Football Club coaches
2004 deaths
One-time VFL/AFL Premiership players